Eum Moon-suk (born 7 December, 1982), also known by stage name SIC, is a South Korean actor and singer. He is best known for his roles in the television series The Fiery Priest (2019), Backstreet Rookie (2020), and Hello, Me! (2021), as well as the films Pipeline (2021) and The Roundup (2022).

Filmography

Film

Television series

Television shows

Music videos

Direction

Theater

Discography

Albums 
 SIC 01 (2005)
 Today (2006)

Awards and nominations

References

External links 
 
 
 

1982 births
Living people
People from Asan
South Korean male television actors
South Korean male film actors
21st-century South Korean male actors
South Korean television personalities
South Korean male singers